Young Pioneers is a 1976 American Western television film which aired in March 1976 on ABC. Elements of novels Let the Hurricane Roar and Free Land by Rose Wilder Lane (daughter of Laura Ingalls Wilder) were used as the basis for the movie, with Roger Kern and Linda Purl starring as the focal characters David and Molly Beaton.  Although produced as a TV series pilot by ABC Circle Films and ranked #7 in the Nielsen ratings for the week it aired, the movie was not immediately picked up by ABC as a series.  A second pilot attempt was made in December 1976 with Young Pioneers' Christmas, but ranked lower at #37 in the Nielsen ratings. In 1978 The Young Pioneers (miniseries) was broadcast.

Plot
David and Molly Beaton, 18-years-old and 16-years-old respectively, marry and leave their native Iowa to make a life for themselves as homesteaders in the Dakota Territory of the early 1870s.  The U.S. Government Homestead Act offers applicants 160 acres of land in undeveloped areas. Those who stay on the land for five years become the official owners.  The young couple manages to survive government and railroad corruption, and perseveres through blizzards, a grasshopper invasion, crop destruction, and giving birth in a sod house among other challenges.

Production
The project was developed and produced by Ed Friendly for ABC Circle Films with the script written by Blanche Hanalis and directed by Michael O'Herlihy. Ed Friendly and Blanche Hanalis had previously produced and scripted the television series pilot for Little House on the Prairie based on the novels by Laura Ingalls Wilder, the mother Rose Wilder Lane.

400 actors and actresses were interviewed before Linda Purl and Roger Kern were offered the lead roles of Molly and David Beaton.

Principal photography began November 28, 1975, in Southern Arizona with additional filming at the Old Tucson Studios in Tucson, Arizona.  A scene with 180,000 grasshoppers was done on location in Nogales, Mexico. Sound stages at 20th-Century Fox in Los Angeles, California were used for the blizzard scenes.

Cast

Roger Kern as David Beaton
Linda Purl as Molly Beaton
Robert Hays as Dan Grey
Shelly Juttner as Nettie Peters
Robert Donner as Mr. Peters
Frank Marth as Mr. Svenson
Brendan Dillon as Doyle
Charles Tyner as Mr. Beaton
Jonathan Kidd as Dr. Thorne
Arnold Soboloff as Clerk in Land Office
Britt Leach as Mr. Loftus
Dennis Fimple as Man in Land Office
Bernice Smith as Mrs. Svenson
Janis Jamison as Eliza
Jeff Cotler as Charlie Peters
Lucky Hayes as Second Woman
Earl W. Smith as Man in Boxcar
Michelle Stacy as Flora Peters
Mare Winningham as Nettie Peters

References

External links
 Young Pioneers (1976), Internet Movie Database (IMDB.com)
 About Blanche Hanalis, LittleHouseonthePrairie.com
 Rose Wilder Lane and Laura Ingalls Wilder, Hoover Presidential Library and Museum

ABC network original films
1976 Western (genre) films
1976 television films
American Western (genre) television films
Films set in the 1870s
Films scored by Laurence Rosenthal
Films directed by Michael O'Herlihy
1970s English-language films